Cretas or Cretes (also known as Queretes) is a municipality located in the Matarraña/Matarranya comarca, province of Teruel, Aragon, Spain. According to the 2004 census (INE), the municipality has a population of 588 inhabitants. It belongs to the Catalan-speaking strip in eastern Aragon known as La Franja.

See also
Matarraña/Matarranya

References

External links 

Matarranya Aragon Guide

Municipalities in the Province of Teruel
Matarraña/Matarranya
La Franja